Menaye Donkor (born 20 March 1981) is a Canadian-born Ghanaian businesswoman, entrepreneur, philanthropist, and former beauty queen who was named Miss Universe Ghana 2004, and represented Ghana in Miss Universe 2004. Donkor is the wife of Ghanaian professional footballer Sulley Muntari.

Early life and education
Menaye Donkor was brought up by her parents in Accra, Ghana, and is the youngest of seven siblings with four brothers and two sisters. At the age of seven, she inherited the job title of "Royal Stool Bearer" from her paternal grandmother, who is the Queen mother of Agona Asafo. Donkor received her childhood education in Ghana, lived and studied in Boston, Massachusetts, USA, during her high school years, and moved back to her birthplace in Toronto to study marketing and business marketing at York University, where she graduated with honors. In the summer of 2011, she studied film at The Studio (formerly The Sally Johnson Studio) in New York City and then completed a film course with Brian Deacon at the London Academy of Film, Media and Television.

Career
In her early twenties, Donkor won the title Miss Universe Ghana, and spent a few years working as a model. She appeared on the covers of many magazines in Ghana, South Africa, and Italy such as New African Woman, Pompey Life, SportsWeek (La Gazetta dello sport), Canoe Magazine, and Maxim Italy. She represented Chopard at The Cannes Films Festival in 2012 and 2013 respectively. She co-managed and marketed her then-boyfriend Sulley Muntari brand from 2006 until 2009. In 2012, she became the face of Printex, a fabric and textiles company in Ghana.  Menaye was the ambassador of Africa Fashion Week London in both 2012 and 2013. She also owns and manages a real estate company in Ghana.

SHE-Y by Menaye 
Menaye developed and founded the luxury Italian brand SHE-Y. The brand launched its first all-natural products early in 2016 using ethically sourced Shea butter from Ghana. Her brand plays a part in her charity work by creating more job opportunities in Shea Butter production. A percentage of the sales profit of SHE-Y is donated towards Menaye Charity Organization to help educate less fortunate children.

Philanthropy 
Menaye founded the Menaye Charity Organization in 2004 contributing to the welfare of underprivileged children by providing free quality education in Ghana. Donkor has worked tirelessly for over a decade to improve the lives of women and children in her home country Ghana through the Menaye Charity Organization. The Organization provides free quality basic education and scholarships to rural underprivileged children in Ghana, health care, and the developmental of young girls. She is solely responsible for raising funds to support the organization.

In 2021, her firm Sincerëly Ghana Limited, partnered with project BRAVE to provide sanitary pads to young women in Keta in the Volta region. The company launched the Sister-2-Sister initiative to provide sanitary pads to ladies in underprivileged communities in Ghana.

The Menaye School of Hope 
The school was founded on 7 September 2000 in the central region of Ghana. Menaye Donkor adopted the school in 2004 after winning Miss Universe Ghana to help build a better environment for the children as the original school lacked in basic necessities.

The school is located in Agona Asafo, which is considered one of the most deprived regions of the country, with high poverty and extreme illiteracy rates. Having started with 78 pupils sharing one school block, the school now has over 400 children and three blocks, helping students achieve excellent results in their BECE (pre-secondary school) examinations. The Menaye Charity Organisation funds everything for the school, from the buildings and equipment to the teachers’ salaries, as well as uniforms, books and stationery.

Honours and recognition 
In September 2012, Menaye was honored and chosen by the Chief and elders, of Agona Asafo in the Central Region of Ghana, to be the ‘Nkosuohemaa’ or ‘Development Queen’ of Agona Asafo.  Her official title is Nanahemaa Menaye Afumade Afrakoma I. It signifies her global responsibility to her people and as well as her contributions to society.

In 2013 she made the list of the 15 Most Influential Africans in Canada, which celebrated individuals who continuously inspire others through great achievements. In 2015, Menaye was honored with the "Woman of The Year" award by the Infant Charity Award in Milan. The Infant Charity Award is an organization that recognizes the work of different individuals and associations who support improving the lives of sick children.

References

External links
 "About : Menaye Donkor is a model/actress, entrepreneur and philanthropist." www.menaye.com. Retrieved 1 April 2014
 "Menaye Charity Organisation Presents Menaye School of Hope GALA ...‘Together for Hope." www.modernghana.com. Retrieved 1 April 2014
 "Menye Donkor" Retrieved 1 April 2014
 Menaye Donkor at Vogue

1981 births
Canadian businesspeople
Canadian people of Ghanaian descent
Financial advisors
Association footballers' wives and girlfriends
Ghanaian beauty pageant winners
Ghanaian businesspeople
Ghanaian people of Canadian descent
Living people
Miss Universe 2004 contestants
Place of birth missing (living people)
York University alumni
Miss Universe Ghana winners